The Benin Handball Federation (FBHB) is the administrative and controlling body for handball and beach handball in Republic of Benin. FBHB is a member of the African Handball Confederation (CAHB) and member of the International Handball Federation (IHF) since 1966.

National teams
 Benin men's national handball team
 Benin men's national junior handball team
 Benin women's national handball team
 Benin national beach handball team
 Benin women's national beach handball team

References

External links
 Benin at the IHF website.

Sports organizations established in 1966
Handball governing bodies
Handball in Benin
Sports governing bodies in Benin
African Handball Confederation
National members of the International Handball Federation